The 2017 Galway Senior Hurling Championship was the 120th staging of the Galway Senior Hurling Championship since its establishment in 1887.

St. Thomas' were the reigning champions. Ahascragh-Fohenagh participated in the senior championship having been promoted from the intermediate competition in 2016.

The title was won by the Galway city based Liam Mellows who defeated Gort in the final. It was their first title in 47 years.

Controversy
Turloughmore's group stage win over Portumna on 3 June 2017 was overturned by the GAA's Disputes Resolution Authority (DRA). Jamie Holland played for Turloughmore having been transferred to Cú Chulainns, Chicago two days earlier.

Group stage

Senior A
Senior A consists of 12 teams divided into two groups of 6. The top two teams from each group automatically qualify for the quarter finals. The third and fourth teams from each group play in the 2017 preliminary quarter finals. The bottom two teams from each group play-off with the losing team relegated to playing in the 2018 Senior B Section.

Senior A - Group 1
{| class="wikitable" 
!width=20|
!  style="width:150px; text-align:left;"|Team
!width=20|
!width=20|
!width=20|
!width=20|
!width=30|
!width=40|
!width=20|
!width=20|
|- style="background:#98FB98;"
|1||align=left| Liam Mellows ||5||4||0||1||8-86||9-61||22||8
|- style="background:#98FB98;"
|2||align=left| Craughwell ||5||3||1||1||9-83||7-68||21||7
|- style="background:#ccf;"
|3||align=left| Cappataggle ||5||2||2||1||8-67||3-79||3||6
|- style="background:#ccf;"
|4||align=left| Tommy Larkin's ||5||2||0||3||7-75||7-79||-7||4
|-
|5||align=left| Mullagh ||5||1||1||3||2-79||1-93||-11||3
|-
|6||align=left| Loughrea ||5||1||0||4||4-86||10-86||-18||2
|}

Senior A - Group 2
{| class="wikitable" 
!width=20|
!  style="width:150px; text-align:left;"|Team
!width=20|
!width=20|
!width=20|
!width=20|
!width=30|
!width=35|
!width=20|
!width=20|
|- style="background:#98FB98;"
|1|| style="text-align:left;"| Sarsfields ||5||3||0||2||5-80||3-78||8||6
|- style="background:#98FB98;"
|2|| style="text-align:left;"| Gort ||5||3||0||2||6-80||5-81||2||6
|- style="background:#ccf;"
|3|| style="text-align:left;"| St. Thomas' ||5||3||0||2||1-89||5-74||3||6
|- style="background:#ccf;"
|4|| style="text-align:left;"| Portumna ||5||2||1||2||7-92||7-79||13||5
|-
|5|| style="text-align:left;"| Turloughmore ||5||3||0||2||3-70||4-82||-15||4
|- 
|6||align=left| Padraig Pearse's ||5||0||1||4||5-62||3-79||-11||1
|}
 Game between Turloughmore and Portumna has been declared null and void.

 Turloughmore forfeited the fixture for playing an ineligible player without award of the game to Portumna. See section "Controversy"

Senior A - Relegation

Senior B
Senior B consists of 12 teams divided into two groups of 6. The winners of each group qualify for the 2017 preliminary quarter finals and compete in the 2018 Senior A competition. The four second and third placed teams play-off with the two winners also qualifying for the 2017 preliminary quarter finals.

Senior B - Group 1

{| class="wikitable" 
!width=20|
!  style="width:150px; text-align:left;"|Team
!width=20|
!width=20|
!width=20|
!width=20|
!width=40|
!width=45|
!width=20|
!width=20|
|- style="background:#98FB98;"
|1|| style="text-align:left;"| Castlegar ||5||5||0||0||10-81||3-69||33||10
|- style="background:#ccf;"
|2|| style="text-align:left;"| Clarinbridge ||5||3||1||1||3-86||4-57||23||7
|- style="background:#ccf;"
|3|| style="text-align:left;"| Tynagh-Abbey/Duniry ||5||2||1||2||9-79||3-74||23||5
|-
|4|| style="text-align:left;"| Beagh ||5||2||0||3||7-81||6-61||23||4
|-
|5|| style="text-align:left;"| Ardrahan ||5||2||0||3||8-70||6-74||2||4
|-
|6||align=left| Carnmore ||5||0||0||5||2-48||16-110||-104||0
|}

Senior B - Group 2

{| class="wikitable" 
!width=20|
!  style="width:150px; text-align:left;"|Team
!width=20|
!width=20|
!width=20|
!width=20|
!width=30|
!width=40|
!width=20|
!width=20|
|- style="background:#98FB98;"
|1||align=left| Kilnadeema-Leitrim ||5||4||0||1||8-83||6-79||20||8
|- style="background:#ccf;"
|2||align=left| Killimordaly ||5||3||1||1||3-88||6-76||3||7
|- style="background:#ccf;"
|3||align=left| Athenry ||5||2||2||1||6-76||1-66||-25||6
|-
|4||align=left| Moycullen ||5||2||1||2||5-74||4-77||0||5
|-
|5||align=left| Ahascragh-Fohenagh ||5||2||0||3||3-62||12-67||-23||4
|-
|6||align=left| Abbeyknockmoy ||5||0||0||5||4-71||5-81||-15||0
|}

Senior B - playoffs

The second team in Senior B Group 1 plays the third team in Senior B Group 2 and the third team in Senior B Group 1 plays the second team in Senior B Group 2. The two winning teams qualify for the 2017 preliminary quarter finals.

Senior B - Relegation
The relegated team will play in the Intermediate Championship in 2018.

Knockout stage

Preliminary Quarter-finals

Quarter-finals

Semi-finals

Final

References

Galway Senior Hurling Championship
Galway Senior Hurling Championship